North West Warriors cricket team were established in 2013, and accorded first-class status in 2017, playing in the Irish Inter-Provincial Championship. Since then, they have played first-class, List A and Twenty20 cricket at a number of different home grounds. Their first home first-class match was against Northern Knights in 2017 at Woodvale Road in Eglinton, County Londonderry.

As of 4 September 2018, North West Warriors have played four home first-class matches, four List A matches, and five Twenty20 matches at three different home grounds. The three grounds that North West Warriors have used for home matches are listed below, with statistics complete through the end of the 2018 season.

List of grounds

See also
List of cricket grounds in Ireland

Notes

References

North West Warriors
Cricket grounds in Ireland
Cricket grounds in Northern Ireland